Sisir Kumar Adhikari (born 19 September 1941) is an Indian politician who represented Kanthi Lok Sabha constituency from 2009 till 2021.  He is a former Union Minister of State for Rural Development in the Manmohan Singh government.

He (Sisir Adhikari) was the Member of Legislative Assembly from Kanthi Dakshin from 2001 to 2006 and Egra from 2006 to 2009. He was the Chairman of Contai Municipality for more than 25 years. Along with his son, Suvendu Adhikari, who was elected from Tamluk, he played a key role in the Nandigram anti-land acquisition stir.

Early life and education
Adhikari was born on 19 September 1941 to father Kenaram Adhikari and mother Kadambini Adhikari in Karkuli, Purba Medinipur, West Bengal in an affluent family of freedom fighters. He studied Intermediate of Science at University of Calcutta and passed in 1960.

Personal life 
Sisir Adhikari is married to Gayatri Adhikari and has four sons including Suvendu Adhikari, who is Leader of Opposition of Legislative Assembly in West Bengal, Dibyendu Adhikari, elected to Lok Sabha in 2019 from Tamluk, and Soumendu Adhikari, former Chairman of Contai Municipality.

References

Living people
People from Purba Medinipur district
India MPs 2009–2014
Trinamool Congress politicians from West Bengal
1941 births
Lok Sabha members from West Bengal
India MPs 2014–2019
University of Calcutta alumni
India MPs 2019–present
West Bengal MLAs 1982–1987
West Bengal MLAs 2001–2006
West Bengal MLAs 2006–2011
Bharatiya Janata Party politicians from West Bengal